Aphaenogaster mediterrae has been discovered and described by S. O. Shattuck in 2008.

References

mediterrae